Connor Walsh may refer to:

 Connor Walsh (ballet dancer), an American ballet dancer
 Connor Walsh (character), a character on How to Get Away with Murder